Everett Burton Helm (17 July 1913, Minneapolis – 25 June 1999, Berlin) was an American composer, musicologist and music critic.

He studied at Harvard, and then after having been awarded a travel fellowship, with Gian Francesco Malipiero in Italy and Ralph Vaughan Williams in England.  In 1948, he was appointed Music Officer for the occupying US army in Germany which introduced him to the Darmstadt Internationale Ferienkurse für Neue Musik in contemporary classical music.  Helm regularly participated in the Darmstadt summer schools over the next decades.

From 1950 and into the 1960s, Helm worked as a music critic in Germany, writing for The New York Times, the San Francisco Chronicle and Musical America.  In parallel, he was composing.  The Berlin Philharmonic Orchestra commissioned and premiered his First Piano Concerto in 1951, the same year as his first opera, Adam and Eve, was performed at the Hessisches Staatstheater Wiesbaden.

Sources
Sonneck Society for American Music Bulletin, Volume XXV, no. 3: Obituary for Helm .
Grove Music Online: article on Helm.

American male classical composers
American classical composers
1913 births
1999 deaths
Harvard University alumni
20th-century classical composers
Musicians from Minneapolis
Pupils of Ralph Vaughan Williams
American music critics
American male journalists
20th-century American journalists
Writers from Minneapolis
American expatriates in Germany
20th-century American composers
20th-century American male musicians